Katherine Liberovskaya (born 1961) is a Canadian video artist. Liberovskaya is known primarily for her experimental video works. She received her PhD from the Université du Québec à Montréal.

Her work is included in the collections of the National Gallery of Canada and Videographe, Montreal.

References

20th-century Canadian women artists
21st-century Canadian women artists
1961 births
Living people
20th-century Canadian artists
21st-century Canadian artists